François-Nicolas Alphonse Signol,(Saint-Mandé c. 1800 – Vincennes, 26 June 1830) was an early 19th-century French playwright and novelist.

Biography 
His plays were presented on the most important Parisian stages of his time including the Théâtre des Variétés, the Théâtre des Nouveautés, and the Théâtre de l'Ambigu-Comique. His novel Le Commissionnaire is sometimes attributed to George Sand and Jules Sandeau who allegedly used his name for promotion. 

He was killed in a duel against a military after an altercation at the Théâtre italien de Paris.

Works 
1826: De la maçonnerie considérée dans quelques-uns de ses rapports avec la politique
1828: Le Caporal et le Paysan, with Armand d'Artois
1828: Le Duel, drama in 2 acts
1828: Jean, play in three  parts, mingled with couplets, with Emmanuel Théaulon
1828: L'École de natation, tableau-vaudeville in 1 act, with Adolphe de Leuven and Charles de Livry
1829: Apologie du duel, ou Quelques mots sur le nouveau projet de loi
1829: Le Pacha et la Vivandière, folie vaudeville in 3 tableaux
1830: La Lingère, ou la Vie de Paris en 1830, 5 vol.
1830: Mémorial de Sir Hudson Lowe, relatif à la captivité de Napoléon
1831: Le Chiffonnier, 5 vol., with Stanislas Macaire
1831: Le Commissionnaire, mœurs du XIXe

Bibliography 
 Joseph Marie Quérard, La France littéraire ou dictionnaire bibliographique des savants, vol.8, 1838, p. 136
 Louis Gabriel Michaud, Biographie universelle, vol.82, 1849, p. 236-237
 Pierre Chevallier, Histoire de la Franc-Maçonnerie française, 1974
 François Guillet, La Mort en face : Histoire du duel en France, 2010

References 

19th-century French dramatists and playwrights
19th-century French novelists
People from Saint-Mandé
1800 births
Duelling fatalities
1830 deaths